"Sista Big Bones" is the second and final single from Anthony Hamilton's third studio album, Ain't Nobody Worryin' (2005). As an airplay-only single, it debuted at number seventy on the Billboard Hot R&B/Hip-Hop Songs the week of August 26, 2006, spending twenty weeks and peaking at number sixty in the process. The song itself celebrates full-figured black women. The video's very own 'Sista Big Bones' was played by actress and TV personality Mo'Nique.

Charts

2005 songs
2006 singles
Anthony Hamilton (musician) songs
Songs written by Mark Batson
Song recordings produced by Mark Batson
Arista Records singles
Body image in popular culture
Songs written by Anthony Hamilton (musician)